You is a Canadian drama film, directed by François Delisle and released in 2007. The film stars Anne-Marie Cadieux as Michèle, an emotionally troubled woman who leaves her unhappy marriage to Paul (Laurent Lucas) for her lover Thomas (Marc Béland), only to discover that being with Thomas does not make her any happier.

The film's cast also includes Ève Cournoyer, Raphaël Dury, Marie-France Lambert and Michelle Rossignol.

Cadieux received a Genie Award nomination for Best Actress at the 28th Genie Awards.

References

External links
 

2007 films
2007 drama films
Canadian drama films
Films set in Quebec
Films shot in Quebec
Films directed by François Delisle
French-language Canadian films
2000s Canadian films